Bimose Tribal Council is a First Nations council, one of three such councils on the Grand Council of Treaty 3. Its members include:
 Asubpeeschoseewagong First Nation
 Eagle Lake First Nation
 Iskatewizaagegan 39 Independent First Nation
 Lac des Mille Lacs First Nation
 Naotkamegwanning First Nation
 Niisaachewan Anishinaabe Nation
 Obashkaandagaang Bay First Nation
 Shoal Lake 40 First Nation
 Wabaseemoong Independent Nations
 Wabauskang First Nation, and
 Wabigoon Lake Ojibway Nation

External links
 Official page 

First Nations governments in Ontario